Sergey Osipov (born 1 October 1950) is a Russian luger. He competed in the men's singles and doubles events at the 1972 Winter Olympics.

References

1950 births
Living people
Russian male lugers
Olympic lugers of the Soviet Union
Lugers at the 1972 Winter Olympics
Sportspeople from Saint Petersburg